Jacob Dlamini is the name of:
 Jacob Dlamini (author), South African journalist, historian and author
 Jacob Dlamini (bishop)